

Champion
On March 19, 1969, in St. Boniface, the Dauphin Kings were crowned MJHL Champions, capturing the Turnbull Memorial Trophy. The Kings trounced the St. Boniface Saints 5-1, to swept the best of seven in four straight games.

League notes
The MJHL merged with the Central Manitoba Junior Hockey League creating a North Division to house all 4 new teams, the Selkirk Steelers, Portage Terriers, Dauphin Kings, and Kenora Muskies (who operated out of Fort Garry the previous year). The existing teams created the South Division.

Regular season

All-Star Games
The League's North Division All-Stars pumped in three goals in the opening 20 minutes and then cruised their way to an easy 6-0 win over the South Division selects in Portage on a stormy January 8. Ken McCluskey, Curt Ridley and Ron Low shared the shut-out. Each handled 10 shots during their 20-minute stints. Mickey Walsh went all the way for the South facing 43 shots. Ken George scored a pair, Chuck Arnason, Ron Ramsey, Moe Brunel, and Clayton Kemp added singles.

North Division Lineup:
Goal: Ken McCluskey (Selkirk); Curt Ridley (Portage); Ron Low (Dauphin)
Defence: Hugh Moran (Portage); John Roy (Dauphin); 
Forwards: Chuck Arnason (Selkirk); Moe Brunel (Selkirk); Ken George (Kenora); Clayton Kemp (Dauphin); Ed Larkin (Portage); Ron Ramsey (Selkirk); Bob Saull (Portage); Tom Thomsen (Kenora);  
South Division Lineup: 
Goal: Mickey Walsh (St. Boniface);
Defence: John Neil (West Kildonan); Bill Palmer (St. Boniface); Rich Tathum (St. James) 
Coach: Muzz MacPherson (Winnipeg)

On January 10, the South Division All-Stars trounced their Japanese visitors, the Seibu hockey club, 
7-2 at the St. James Civic Centre. The All-Stars led 3-1 and 4-2 by periods. Four St. Boniface players,
Rick Sedgewick, Wayne Altomare, Brian Clague and Wayne Albo scored. Jim Johnston
of St. James, John Neil of West Kildonan, and Brian Harding of Winnipeg scored the other Stars goals. Koji Iwimpto and Mel Wakabayashi replied for Seibu.
MJHL Lineup:
Goal: Mickey Walsh (St. Boniface); Dan Stephens (St. James)
Defence: Bob Winograd (Winnipeg); Terry Proctor (St. Boniface); Bill Palmer (St. Boniface); Rich Tathum (St. James); Terry Taylor (St. James); John Neil (West Kildonan)
Centre: Wally McCheyne (Winnipeg); Pierre Chartier (St. James); Rick Sedgwick (St. Boniface); Wayne Altomare (St. Boniface)
Leftwing: Brian Howie (West Kildonan); Lanny Gregory (Winnipeg); Wayne Albo (St. Boniface); Brian Clague (St. Boniface)
Rightwing: Jim Johnston (St. James); Dan Hiebert (St. Boniface); Dave McConachy (St. James); Brian Harding (Winnipeg)
Coach Al Tesoor (St. Boniface)

On January 24, in Dauphin Canadian born Mel Wakabayshi scored three goals to spark Seibu 
of Japan to an 8-6 victory over the North Division All-Stars before a capacity crowd of more 
than 2,500. Japan led 3-1 and 6-3 by periods. Rounding out the Japanese scoring were 
Norio Fukuda, Fumio Yamazaki, Isamu Owata, Tadashi Makawama and Koji Iwamato. 
Bob Leguilloux of Dauphin and Chuck Arnason of Selkirk scored two goals each. 
Jim Cahoon of Dauphin and Terry Hart of Selkirk got the other all-star goals.

Playoffs
Divisional Semi-Finals
Selkirk lost to Kenora 4-games-to-1
St. Boniface defeated St. James 4-games-to-2
Divisional Finals
Dauphin defeated Kenora 4-games-to-2
Winnipeg lost to St. Boniface 4-games-to-3 
Turnbull Cup Championship
Dauphin defeated St. Boniface 4-games-to-none
Western Memorial Cup Semi-Final
Dauphin defeated Westfort Hurricanes (TBJHL) 4-games-to-2
Western Memorial Cup Final (Abbott Cup)
Dauphin lost to Regina Pats (SJHL) 4-games-to-3

Scoring leaders

Awards

All-Star Teams

References
Manitoba Junior Hockey League
Manitoba Hockey Hall of Fame
Hockey Hall of Fame
Winnipeg Free Press Archives
Brandon Sun Archives

MJHL
Manitoba Junior Hockey League seasons